Tarinkot District, also spelled as Tarin Kowt, is a district of Uruzgan Province, Afghanistan. The capital of the district and the province is the town called Tarinkot.

In Tarinkot district, two Pashtun tribal confederations are represented, the Tareen or Tarin tribes: Popolzai, Barakzai, Alikozai, Achakzai; and the Ghilzai tribes: Tokhi, Hotak, Suleiman-Khel.

See also
Districts of Afghanistan
Tareen
Ghilzai or Khilji

References

External links
 Map of Settlements United Nations, AIMS, May 2002

Districts of Urozgan Province